Martha Bass (March 7, 1921September 21, 1998) was an American gospel singer.

After migrating to St. Louis as a young girl, she joined the Pleasant Green Baptist Church, where she was a promising gospel vocalist. She came under the authoritative and watchful tutelage of Mother Willie Mae Ford Smith, the head of the Soloists Beareau in gospel composer Thomas A. Dorsey's National Convention of Gospel Choirs and Choruses and the founder of the St. Louis Chapter of the organization, and it was there that she developed into a "house wrecker" as they are called in gospel.

With Mother Ford's teaching and a wealth of church singing experience under her belt, she left St. Louis in the early 1950s to travel with the great Clara Ward Singers, but left after one year. Only one recording, "Wasn't it a Pity How They Punished my Lord", remains of her time with the Clara Ward Singers.

In the 1960s her album, "I'm So Grateful", established her as a gospel singer of the first rank. When her daughter Fontella Bass returned to her gospel roots, Martha Bass cut several tracks with Fontella and Martha's son, the gospel singer David Peaston. She was married to James Peaston (1914-1981).

References

1921 births
1998 deaths
Musicians from St. Louis
American gospel singers
Checker Records artists
Place of birth missing
20th-century American singers
Singers from Missouri